Bredbury and Romiley are towns in the Metropolitan Borough of Stockport, Greater Manchester, England. The towns, together with the area of Woodley and the village of Compstall and the surrounding countryside, contain 43 listed buildings that are recorded in the National Heritage List for England. Of these, two are listed at Grade II*, the middle grade, and the others are at Grade II, the lowest grade.

Most of the oldest listed buildings that date from before the Industrial Revolution are houses, farm houses and farm buildings, together with a chapel and a public house. The Peak Forest Canal which passes through the area helped to bring industry, in particular the textile industry. The listed building associated with the canal include bridges, an aqueduct, and the entrances to Woodley Tunnel. Two cotton mills, now used for other purposes, have survived and are listed, and the other listed buildings include churches, a bridge, and two war memorials.



Key

Buildings

References

Citations

Sources

Lists of listed buildings in Greater Manchester
Buildings and structures in the Metropolitan Borough of Stockport